The 1909 Vermont Green and Gold football team was an American football team that represented  the University of Vermont as an independent during the 1909 college football season. In their only year under head coach Ray B. Thomas, the team compiled a 4–2–2 record.

Schedule

References

Vermont
Vermont Catamounts football seasons
Vermont Green and Gold football